Secret language  may refer to:
 Cant (language), also known as cryptolect, the jargon or argot of a group, often employed to exclude or mislead people outside the group
 Argot, strictly a proper language with its own grammar, used to prevent understanding by outsiders; sometimes argot is used as a synonym of cant or jargon
 Sacred language, also called a ceremonial or a ritual language, which is only learned and used by a select initiated group

See also 
 Cryptography, the practice and study of hidden information
 Language game, a system of manipulating spoken words to render them incomprehensible to the untrained ear